The 1903 Tour de France was the 1st edition of Tour de France, one of cycling's Grand Tours. The Tour began in Paris on 1 July and Stage 3 occurred on 8 July with a flat stage to Toulouse. The race finished at the Parc des Princes in Paris on 18 July.

Stage 1
1 July 1903 — Paris (Montgeron) to Lyon, 

The inaugural stage of the Tour de France departed from the Cafe au Réveil-Matin, in the south-eastern Paris suburb of Montgeron, at 3:16 p.m. The route headed south through Fontainebleau, Corbeil, Melun, Montargis, Nevers, Moulins, Lapalisse and Roanne, before arriving in Lyon. The riders had raced through the evening and night, to arrive from about 9 a.m. on the following day.

Stage 2
5 July 1903 — Lyon to Marseille,

Stage 3
8 July 1903 — Marseille to Toulouse,

References

Further reading

1903 Tour de France
Tour de France stages